Lecaniodiscus punctatus is a species of plant in the family Sapindaceae. It is found in Cameroon and Ghana. It is threatened by habitat loss.

References

punctatus
Endangered plants
Taxonomy articles created by Polbot